Auburn is an unincorporated community in Ellis County, in the U.S. state of Texas.

History
Auburn was originally called Autumn, having been first settled in the autumn season in the early 1850s. A post office was established under the name Auburn in 1877, and remained in operation until 1906. The Auburn Cemetery is a Recorded Texas Historic Landmark.

References

Unincorporated communities in Ellis County, Texas
Unincorporated communities in Texas